The Boomtang Boys are Canadian dance-remix musicians and music producers. They are known for both their remix work and pop-dance music, in particular their singles "Squeeze Toy" and "Movin' On", which both topped the Canadian Singles Chart.

History
The Boomtang Boys first came together in 1991 as a music production group. The group created dance-friendly remixes of familiar songs, as well as produced music for a number of musicians and bands, including the Juno-awarded Deeper Shade of Love by Camille.

Their debut album, Greatest Hits Volume One, was released in 1999 and produced the hit "Squeeze Toy" as well as "Pictures", both performed by Kim Esty. Greatest Hits did well in Canada, achieving gold status in sales. The single "Popcorn" appeared on the RPM dance chart in 1999. The group also produced "The Hampsterdance Song", a track based on the Hampster Dance meme; the song reached number one on Nielsen SoundScan's Canadian Singles Chart in mid-2000. "Squeeze Toy" and "Movin' On", a single from 2002, topped this chart as well. They also served as executive producers of Hampsterdance: The Album (2000).

In addition to their own recordings, they are known for several remixes for artists such as the Philosopher Kings, Bif Naked, Econoline Crush and Kim Stockwood. They are still active and involved in a number of production and remix projects. Members Tony Grace and Rob DeBoer also tour internationally as the jazz ensemble Four80East.

Paul Grace died on August 7, 2019, at the age of 63.

Discography

Studio albums

Singles

References

External links
 
 

Canadian dance music groups
Canadian musical trios
Canadian Eurodance groups
Musical groups established in 1991
Musical groups from Toronto
Remixers
1991 establishments in Ontario